Aile Asszonyi (born on 22 July 1975) is an Estonian soprano.

Discography
2003 Tormis Vision of Estonia I Estonian National Male Chorus Alba records (UPC: 641713120175)
2011 Isidora Žebeljan Rukoveti Janáček Philharmonic Orchestra CPO label (CPO: 777 670‐2) 
2012 Van Gilse Symphony No. 3 Netherlands Symphony Orchestra CPO label (CPO: 777 518‐2)

References

External links

 Aile Asszonyi; Operabase

Living people
21st-century Estonian women opera singers
Estonian operatic sopranos
Estonian Academy of Music and Theatre alumni
1975 births